Chapel Hill Town Hall is a historic town hall located at Chapel Hill, Orange County, North Carolina.  It built in 1938, and is a two-story, red brick, Colonial Revival style building.  It has a full basement and a hipped slate roof topped by an octagonal wooden cupola.

It was listed on the National Register of Historic Places in 1990.

References

City and town halls on the National Register of Historic Places in North Carolina
Colonial Revival architecture in North Carolina
Government buildings completed in 1938
Buildings and structures in Chapel Hill-Carrboro, North Carolina
National Register of Historic Places in Orange County, North Carolina
City and town halls in North Carolina